Emma Burstall (born 1961) is an English author and journalist. She has published several novels and writes for The Guardian and The Independent on Sunday.

Burstall was educated at the St Paul's Girls' School and studied English at Christ's College, Cambridge, graduating from Cambridge University in 1980. She began her career as a reporter on the Western Morning News, later becoming a features editor of Woman and Family Circle. Her first novel Gym and Slimline was published in 2008, followed by Never Close Your Eyes in 2009.

Burstall is married to journalist Kevin Maguire; the couple have three children, two sons and a daughter.

Bibliography

 Gym and Slimline (2008)
 Never Close your Eyes (2009)
 The Darling Girls (2014)
 Tremarnock: The Lives, Loves and Secrets of a Cornish Village (2015)
 The Cornish Guest House (2016)
 Tremarnock Summer (2017)
 A Cornish Secret (2018)
 The Girl Who Came Home to Cornwall (2019)

References

External links
 EmmaBurstall.com

1961 births
Living people
People educated at St Paul's Girls' School
Alumni of Christ's College, Cambridge
English women novelists
English women journalists
20th-century English women writers
20th-century English non-fiction writers
21st-century English women writers
21st-century English novelists
English women non-fiction writers